North Kildonan is a city ward in northern Winnipeg, and a former municipality in Manitoba, Canada. Its population was of 2016 was 44,664.

History
What is now North Kildonan was originally part of the Rural Municipality of Kildonan. In 1914, the rural municipality was divided into the Rural Municipalities of West Kildonan and East Kildonan.

The East Kildonan community at the time, however, was at odds with one another: the southern part was interested in development and was investing heavily towards expanding civic services; the north, on the other hand, was a rural enclave of just 1000 people, with many of its farms dating back to the Selkirk Settler period.

With the north seeking to split off, a petition to the provincial government called for the further division of East Kildonan. As result, on 1 January 1925, the northern portion became incorporated as the Rural Municipality of North Kildonan. Following the split, North Kildonan was forced to assume nearly $100,000 in debt, which the municipal council assured would not be paid off through borrowing money from banks. The debt was finally paid off in 1946.

Following the Second World War, suburban expansion led to development in North Kildonan, bringing new housing, roads, and schools.

In 1969, North Kildonan had three wards. It elected a mayor and four councillors.

In 1972, North Kildonan was amalgamated with the City of Winnipeg, along with the other Kildonans and several other municipalities, to create the current-day city of Winnipeg.

Past reeves

Geography 
North Kildonan is a ward within Winnipeg represented by a member of Winnipeg City Council. Its neighbourhoods include: Rivergrove, Riverbend, Kildonan Drive, Rossmere-A, River East, Springfield North, Springfield South, Valhalla, Kil-Cona Park, and Mcleod Industrial.

The approximate boundary-lines of the ward are as follows:
Glenway Avenue (from Raleigh St. to Henderson Highway),
Red River (from Glenway Ave. to McLeod Ave.),
McLeod Ave. (from Henderson Hwy. to Gateway Road),
Gateway Road (from Oakland Ave. to 100m north of Blantyre Ave.),
Line North of Blantyre Ave. (from Gateway Road to Panet Road),
Panet Road (from line north of Blantyre Ave. to 250 metres south of Almey Ave.),
Line south of Almey Ave. (from Panet Road to Owen St.),
Owen St. to Ravelston Ave. West,
Ravelston Ave. west to Plessis Road,
Plessis Road to Springfield Road,
Springfield Road to the line comprising the north boundary of the City of Winnipeg 100 metres west of Wenzel St.,
and finally a straight line that runs northwest from that location back to the intersection of Raleigh St. and Glenway Ave. (This line runs parallel to, and just north of, Knowles Ave.)

Recreation 

North Kildonan is home to many green spaces, the largest of which is Kil-Cona Park, a former landfill site, located on Springfield Avenue east of Lagimodiere Boulevard. The park offers a wide variety of recreational activities and resources including ponds, open fields, soccer pitches, baseball diamonds, and an off-leash dog area. Located within the park is Harbour View Golf Course & Recreation Complex, which provides visitors with the opportunity to play tennis, lawn bowling, nine holes of golf, or go on pedal boat rides. Winter activities include tobogganing, skating, and cross-country skiing.

The Bunn's Creek Trail is a scenic walking path and bike trail, meandering its way from McIvor Avenue and Raleigh Street to the Red River. The trail ends on a high bank where a wonderful view of the river awaits anyone who completes the nearly 2.5 km trail.

Gateway Community Club (located at 1717 Gateway Rd.) is home to numerous, year-round sports teams including hockey, baseball, softball, and outdoor and indoor soccer. The fields are open to the public when not in use. Indoor and outdoor hockey rinks are available for rented ice-times in winter, as well as the indoor soccer pitch.

Crime rates
The table below shows the crime rates of various crimes in each of the North Kildonan neighborhoods. The crime data spans 5 years from the year 2017 to the year 2021. The rates are crimes per 100,000 residents per year.

See also
List of rural municipalities in Manitoba

References

External links
The Students of Red River Collegiate Present "Our Community": N.E. Winnipeg - click on history link on website
Britannica Encyclopedia
Miles MacDonell Collegiate Alumni Association - North Kildonan History

Kildonan, Winnipeg
Seven Oaks, Winnipeg
Former municipalities now in Winnipeg
Populated places disestablished in 1972
Neighbourhoods in Winnipeg